Shad Dehsar (also Romanized as Shād Dehsar; also known as Shādehsar) is a village in Rudboneh Rural District, Rudboneh District, Lahijan County, Gilan Province, Iran. At the 2006 census, its population was 802, in 229 families.

References 

Populated places in Lahijan County